Coeruleotaygetis is a monotypic butterfly genus in the subfamily Satyrinae. It is considered a synonym of the genus Taygetina. Its one species, Coeruleotaygetis peribaea, is found in the Neotropical realm.

References

Euptychiina
Monotypic butterfly genera
Taxa named by Walter Forster (entomologist)